Karen Rollins Jackson   is a former Virginia Secretary of Technology. Appointed in 2014 by Governor Terry McAuliffe, she was the last to serve in the office before it was dissolved under Governor Ralph Northam. She previously served from 2009 to 2014 as Deputy Secretary of Technology under Governors Tim Kaine and Bob McDonnell. Jackson was born in Newport News, Virginia and was raised in Poquoson. She attended Christopher Newport University, graduating in 1987, and received a Master in Business Administration degree from the College of William & Mary.

References

External links
 Virginia Secretary of Technology

1965 births
Living people
State cabinet secretaries of Virginia
Christopher Newport University alumni
College of William & Mary alumni
Georgetown University Law Center alumni
Women in Virginia politics
People from Poquoson, Virginia
21st-century American politicians
21st-century American women politicians